Law in Christianity may refer to:

 Christian views on the Old Covenant
 Law and Gospel
 Antinomianism
 Legalism (theology)
 Canon law
 Christianity and politics